This is a list of episodes for The Colbert Report in 2005 and 2006.

Development
In 2005, The Daily Show had won Primetime Emmy Awards, and Comedy Central wanted to expand the franchise. Producers were also looking for a way to hold on to Colbert, Daily Show correspondent and co-writer for six seasons, after the show's other breakout star, Steve Carell, left the program to pursue a successful career in film and network television. Jon Stewart and Ben Karlin (The Daily Show's executive producer) supposedly came up with the idea for The Colbert Report after watching coverage of the sexual harassment lawsuit filed against Bill O'Reilly. Jon Stewart's production company, Busboy Productions, developed The Report. Colbert, Stewart, and Karlin pitched the idea of the show (reportedly with one phrase: "our version of The O'Reilly Factor with Stephen Colbert") to Comedy Central chief Doug Herzog, who agreed to run the show for eight weeks without creating a pilot.

The Colbert Report first appeared in the form of three television commercials for itself which aired several times on The Daily Show, although the themes that form the basis for The Report can be seen in the reports of Colbert's correspondent character on The Daily Show. The show debuted on October 17, 2005, with an initial contract for an eight-week run. On November 2, 2005, based on the strong ratings for the show's first two weeks, Comedy Central and Colbert announced they had signed for an additional year, until the end of 2006.

2005

October

November

December

2006

January

February

March
{|class="wikitable plainrowheaders" style="width:100%; margin:auto;"
|-
! style="background-color: #8B0000; color:#ffffff" width=5%   | No.
! style="background-color: #8B0000; color:#ffffff" width=10%  | ""
! style="background-color: #8B0000; color:#ffffff" width=20%  | Guest(s)
! style="background-color: #8B0000; color:#ffffff" width=40%  | Introductory phrase
! style="background-color: #8B0000; color:#ffffff" width=12%  | Original air date
! style="background-color: #8B0000; color:#ffffff" width=10%  | Production  code
|-

{{Episode list
|EpisodeNumber=70
|ProdCode=2038
|Title=I am the Great and Powerful Oz
|Aux2=Dan Senor
|Aux3="Truth hurts, and this is gonna be agonizing."
|OriginalAirDate=March 22 
|ShortSummary=Part sixteen of "Better Know a District; color:#ffffff; with Rep. Brad Sherman (D) of California's 27th congressional district.  Colbert repeatedly references the San Fernando Valley's pornography industry, flustering the representative.  A pornography spoof is also present in which a pizza delivery man "unexpectedly" arrives.  This harkens back, most likely intentionally, to a 2004 episode of The Colbert Reports sister show The Daily Show in which Stephen also investigated the porn industry, that time on the porn industry's funding of the GOP's 2004 re-election campaign.  Stephen repeatedly ran into the same pizza guy during interviews, with similar occurrences to those that happened in this episode happening to Stephen, the pizza guy, and his interviewees.  The episode is notable for the fact that "The Wørd" segment did not air until the second "act" of the show.
|LineColor=8B0000  }}

|}

April

May

June

July

August
{|class="wikitable plainrowheaders" style="width:100%; margin:auto;"
|-
! style="background-color: #8B0000; color:#ffffff" width=5%   | No.
! style="background-color: #8B0000; color:#ffffff" width=10%  | ""
! style="background-color: #8B0000; color:#ffffff" width=20%  | Guest(s)
! style="background-color: #8B0000; color:#ffffff" width=40%  | Introductory phrase
! style="background-color: #8B0000; color:#ffffff" width=12%  | Original air date
! style="background-color: #8B0000; color:#ffffff" width=10%  | Production  code
|-

{{Episode list
|EpisodeNumber=132
|ProdCode=2100
|Title=Ten-Hut!
|Aux2=William C. Rhoden
|Aux3="We're reaching America's youth, nation!  Check it out!" (a child then says from his high chair, "This is The Colbert Report!")|OriginalAirDate=August 8
|ShortSummary=Stephen projects the Connecticut primary result by projecting that Joe Lieberman will not appear on his show.  Stephen gives interior decorating advice for the White House press room. First episode of the animated series Stephen Colbert's Alpha Squad 7: The New Tek Jansen Adventures.  Stephen finally attempts to check in with Jon Stewart and The Daily Show.
|LineColor=8B0000  }}

|}

September
{|class="wikitable plainrowheaders" style="width:100%; margin:auto;"
|-
! style="background-color: #8B0000; color:#ffffff" width=5%   | No.
! style="background-color: #8B0000; color:#ffffff" width=10%  | ""
! style="background-color: #8B0000; color:#ffffff" width=20%  | Guest(s)
! style="background-color: #8B0000; color:#ffffff" width=40%  | Introductory phrase
! style="background-color: #8B0000; color:#ffffff" width=12%  | Original air date
! style="background-color: #8B0000; color:#ffffff" width=10%  | Production  code
|-

{{Episode list
|EpisodeNumber=153
|ProdCode=2121
|Title=Iraq
|Aux2=Lowell Bergman
|Aux3="America, remember the most important gun safety tip: if you have a gun, you'll be safe. This is The Colbert Report!"
|OriginalAirDate=September 27
|ShortSummary=Mort Zuckerman calls the hotline. Colbert at first cannot remember the word, and goes through it trying to remember. 
Tip of the Hat: Chevrolet's new Silverado ad, George Clooney
Wag of the finger: Bill Cosby and his slave museum, Food Labels
Colbert admits there is an Adults-only secret level in his fictional World of Colbertcraft, a play on Grand Theft Autos Hot Coffee mod.
|LineColor=8B0000  }}

|}

October

November

December

Notes
  "Truthiness," the first "Wørd of the day" on The Colbert Report, was voted the 2005 Word of the Year by the American Dialect Society, which credited The Colbert Report for introducing it into the popular vernacular. For more information, see truthiness.  The word "overrated; color:#ffffff; was used in reference to the late Rosa Parks.
  The word "quitter; color:#ffffff; was used in reference to Harriet Miers withdrawing her nomination to the U.S. Supreme Court.
  The word "cat; color:#ffffff; was used in reference to The New York Times misreporting Colbert's first wørd, "Truthiness," as "Trustiness." He explained that the Times should have an easier time with this word.
  The word "hoser; color:#ffffff; was used in reference to Canada.
  The word "TO; color:#ffffff; was used in reference to Terrell Owens and/or "totally obnoxious" — "same difference."
  This Wørd of the day, "The Orient,; color:#ffffff; was changed to "Asia" for political correctness.
  The word "Never; color:#ffffff; was used to answer the question of when to withdraw from Iraq.
  The word "Spectacle; color:#ffffff; was used in regards to capital punishment.
  Although Colbert originally said "Hell, no!; color:#ffffff; when giving the Wørd of the day, it appeared on the screen initially as "Hell, Yes!" It then quickly switched to "Hell, No!" after this intentional "error."
  The word "Travolta; color:#ffffff; was used in reference to John Travolta's role in The Boy in the Plastic Bubble.
  On the January 9, 2006, episode, there was no Wørd of the day because Jack Abramoff pleading guilty to a number of felony criminal charges was said to present no issue, and thus no story.  However, the segment still proceeded as usual, just without any "theme; color:#ffffff; word; the lack of a word itself became the theme.
  The word "¡Cerrado!; color:#ffffff; was in reference to the U.S. borders, with Colbert recommending a wall built not just along the Mexico–US border but also along the Canada–US border and the East and West coasts, and with a dome covering everything inside.
  The word "Old School; color:#ffffff; was used in reference to the purportedly vengeful style of the God of the Old Testament.
  The word "smarterer; color:#ffffff; was used to describe a condition better than being smarter, by being "smarter" at subjects like religion which Colbert identified as being more important than traditional school subjects like math and science; Colbert responded to reports of overseas students outscoring American students at core school subjects by seeking to become "smarterer", such as by learning that the answer to every question in science class is that "God did it."
 The word Public-See was punned as a humorous antonym of Privacy.
  Stephen follows a mistake by Carl Zimmer, who mistakenly gives the name "Edward Colbert" in his original article for The New York Times.
  The word "Jesi; color:#ffffff; was used to refer to more than one Jesus.
  The word "U.S.A.? U.S.A.?; color:#ffffff; was used to signify Colbert's disappointment with the U.S. Olympic team in contrast to his word "U.S.A.! U.S.A.!" on February 9, 2006.
  The phrase translates into English as "Let the Good Times Roll", though Colbert declares that it translates to "Show us your tits."
  The word "Martyr; color:#ffffff; was used to refer to "The death of Tom DeLay's political career."
  The word "Save It; color:#ffffff; was used as in "Save your breath" in reference to arguments about Global warming.
  Introductory phrase from Bart Simpson, Jimmie Walker, Henry Winkler as Fonzie, and Gary Coleman as Arnold Jackson.
   The word "Bard; color:#ffffff; was used "As in, these kids should be bard up in jail", in reference to juvenile rehabilitation.
  The phrase "Drug-Fueled Sex Crime; color:#ffffff; was a suggestion to politically active celebrities such as George Clooney to have one so they can "slink off" and "just say no to political action."
  The word "Lunchables; color:#ffffff; was used to describe how "America should be, in hermetically sealed, individual spaces."
   The opening line refers to the song "I Touch Myself" by Divinyls.
  As the result, many people act upon his instructions and vandalize Wikipedia, with the result that certain articles, including "Elephant", "Oregon", "George Washington", "Latchkey kid", "Serial killer", "Hitler", "The Colbert Report" and "Stephen Colbert" are/were temporarily protected.
  The WØRD segment on August 16, 2006, was done as La PALABRA (with the Ø slash through the second A) by Colbert's Mexican equivalent, Esteban.
  An audience member transformed into a Colbert Report fanatic on 30 Days'' invoked several recurring elements. The WØRD "HELP!; color:#ffffff; was triggered as the man was being led out by security.

External links

References

2005-2006
2005 American television seasons
2006 American television seasons
2005 in American television
2006 in American television